The Video Services Form (VSF) is an industry association that provides a platform for cooperation and communication between organizations with a stake in media networking. VSF activities include standards development, interoperability testing and the ongoing VidTrans conferences.

VSF published the TR-03 and TR-04 technical recommendations for professional video which were further developed by SMPTE to become SMPTE 2110.

Awards
Technology & Engineering Emmy Award for "Standardization and Productization of JPEG2000 (J2K) Interoperability."

References

1998 establishments in the United States
Broadcast engineering
Film and video technology